Wuskwi Sipihk First Nation (Cree ᐘᐢᑿᐩ ᓰᐲᕽ waskway-sîpîhk, meaning: at the Birch River) is a Swampy Cree First Nations band government whose reserve community is located northeast Birch River, Manitoba, along the western shores of Swan Lake. The Rural Municipality of Mountain (North) forms the western and southern borders of the reserve. As of April, 2011, the First Nation had a total registered population of 623 people, of which 197 people lived on their own Indian reserve. The current Chief for the First Nation is Elwood Zastre.

Reserves 
  Wuskwi Sipihk First Nation No. 1
  Wuskwi Sipihk First Nation 2
  Wuskwi Sipihk First Nation 3A
  Wuskwi Sipihk First Nation 3B
  Wuskwi Sipihk First Nation 3C
  Wuskwi Sipihk First Nation 3D
  Wuskwi Sipihk First Nation 3E
  Wuskwi Sipihk First Nation 3F
  Wuskwi Sipihk 4
  Wuskwi Sipihk 5
  Wuskwi Sipihk 6
  Wuskwi Sipihk No. 7
  Wuskwi Sipihk 8
  Treaty Four Reserve Grounds 77, near Fort Qu'Appelle, Saskatchewan, shared with 32 other First Nations.

External links

Map of Swan Lake 65C at Statcan

Swampy Cree Tribal Council
First Nations governments in Manitoba
Cree governments